Manyata Embassy Business Park (also called Manyata Tech Park) is a software technology park in Bangalore, Karnataka, India. The park is situated in Nagawara (near Hebbal) on Outer Ring Road, and has a building area of 9.8 million square feet. The park is spread over 300 acres (1.2 km²).

Occupancy 
Manyata Embassy Business Park has a workforce of more than 150,000 professionals, as of November 2017. Some of the tenant companies of the tech park are Cognizant, L Brands, Lowe's, Cerner, Hudson's Bay Company, Harman, Rolls-Royce, IBM, Justdial.com, Voonik, GLOBALFOUNDRIES, Larsen & Toubro, NXP Semiconductors, Nokia Networks, Philips, Alcatel-Lucent, Fidelity Investments, Target Corporation,Qualitest, Northern Trust, Nvidia, WSP and AXA.

Infra structure
In February 2017, 15 acres (6 hectares) of the park were allotted for a garden where employees could grow food during their free time. In January 2018, a rooftop football arena, covering an area of 13,000 square feet (1,200 m²), was opened.

In June 2018, the Embassy Group signed a deal to build a flyover between Nagawara lake and Thanisandra junction, which would provide direct access to the park.

An 85-acre (34 hectare) residential enclave called Manyata Residency is located behind the park.

Awards 
 The Best IT Park Award by the NDTV Property Awards 2013

References

External links

Software technology parks in Bangalore
Embassy Group
Special Economic Zones of India